Toot, Toot, Tootsie (Goo' Bye!) is a 1922 song with music and lyrics by Gus Kahn, Ernie Erdman and Danny Russo, per the credits on the original sheet music cover. Some other sources also credit Ted Fio Rito and Robert King for the song, but make no mention of Dan Russo. It debuted in the Broadway musical Bombo, where it was a major hit. It was first recorded by Al Jolson with Frank Crumit's orchestra for Columbia Records on September 9, 1922. It was further popularised by Eddie Cantor, nicknamed "Banjo Eyes".

This song has become associated with the age and image of the flapper during the Roaring Twenties. Whilst the Jolson version was the most popular, other high selling versions in 1923 were those by Ernest Hare & Billy Jones, Vincent Lopez, and Benson Orchestra of Chicago. 

"Toot, Toot, Tootsie" appeared in the films The Jazz Singer (1927), Rose of Washington Square (1939), The Jolson Story (1946),  I'll See You in My Dreams (1951),  and Remains to Be Seen (1953). It was also performed in "Aunt Bee's Medicine Man" episode of  The Andy Griffith Show , the fifth episode of The Brady Bunch Hour and the eleventh episode of season 4 of Gimme a Break!.

Other artists who recorded the song include Billy Murray together with Ed Smalle; Hoosier Hot Shots, Art Mooney, Eddy Howard, Wayne Newton, Jerry Vale, Brenda Lee, and Jack Mudurian.

See also
List of train songs

References

External links
Recording by Al Jolson
1923 singles
1922 songs
Al Jolson songs
Songs about trains
Flappers